Iraq competed at the 2014 Summer Youth Olympics, in Nanjing, China from 16 August to 28 August 2014.

Medalists

Athletics

Iraq qualified two athletes.

Qualification Legend: Q=Final A (medal); qB=Final B (non-medal); qC=Final C (non-medal); qD=Final D (non-medal); qE=Final E (non-medal)

Boys
Field Events

Fencing

Iraq was given a quota to compete by the tripartite committee.

Boys

Gymnastics

Artistic Gymnastics

Iraq qualified one athlete based on its performance at the 2014 Asian Artistic Gymnastics Championships.

Girls

Weightlifting

Iraq was given a quota to compete in a boys' event by the tripartite committee.

Boys

References

2014 in Iraqi sport
Nations at the 2014 Summer Youth Olympics
Iraq at the Youth Olympics